Raitundi is a village in Kendrapara district of Odisha state, India.  It is located near Bazar, Sadanandapur, Panchupandab.

Villages in Kendrapara district